Dušan Salfický (born 28 March 1972 in Chrudim, Czechoslovakia) is a Czech former professional ice hockey goaltender. He was drafted 132nd overall by the National Hockey League's New York Islanders in the 2001 NHL Entry Draft but only played 4 games for the Islander's American Hockey League farm team, the Bridgeport Sound Tigers.

References

External links
 

1972 births
Living people
Atlant Moscow Oblast players
Bridgeport Sound Tigers players
Czech ice hockey goaltenders
Czech expatriate ice hockey players in Russia
HC CSKA Moscow players
HC Dynamo Pardubice players
HC Karlovy Vary players
HC Plzeň players
HC Slovan Ústečtí Lvi players
HC Sparta Praha players
New York Islanders draft picks
Orli Znojmo players
People from Chrudim
Severstal Cherepovets players
Stadion Hradec Králové players
HC Stadion Litoměřice players
HC Tábor players
Torpedo Nizhny Novgorod players
Tri-City Americans players
Sportspeople from the Pardubice Region
Czechoslovak expatriate sportspeople in the United States
Czechoslovak expatriate ice hockey people
Czechoslovak ice hockey goaltenders
Czech expatriate ice hockey players in the United States